is a Japanese figure skater (men's singles and ice dance) and ice show producer. As a singles skater, he is the 2010 Olympic bronze medalist, the 2010 World champion, the 2012–13 Grand Prix Final champion, a two-time (2008, 2011) Four Continents champion, and a five-time (2006-2008, 2010, 2012) Japanese national champion.

Takahashi represented Japan at the 2006 Winter Olympics, 2010 Winter Olympics, and 2014 Winter Olympics. His bronze medal at the 2010 Winter Olympics was the first Olympic medal for Japan in the men's singles event. He was also the first Asian man to win a World title at the 2010 World Championships. At the 2012–13 Grand Prix Final, Takahashi made history again as the first Japanese man to win a gold medal in the event, an addition to his previous accomplishment of being the first Japanese man to medal at the event in 2005.

Takahashi retired on October 14, 2014, but returned to competitive skating on July 1, 2018. After two seasons competing domestically in Japan, Takahashi began a career in ice dance partnered with Kana Muramoto beginning in the 2020–21 season. With Muramoto he is the 2022 Four Continents silver medalist, the 2022-23 Japanese national champion and the 2022 Denis Ten Memorial Challenge champion. Takahashi is the first and at present only competitor to have earned medals at the Four Continents Figure Skating Championships in two different disciplines.

He is not only a pioneer in the field of competitive skating in Japan, but also a key individual in innovating the Japanese ice show market by headlining novel cross-genre show formats (such as the combination of kabuki and figure skating), which implement technologies like projection mapping and take on underrepresented themes such as the portrayal of same-sex attraction. In addition to ice shows, he has also performed as a dancer in Cheryl Burke's stage production Love on the Floor.

Career

Early career
Born in Kurashiki, Okayama Prefecture, Japan, Takahashi began figure skating when he was eight years old. When a skating rink was built near his house, he went with his mother to watch the skaters at the rink and, afterward, enrolled in the figure skating club. His mother intended for him to enroll in the ice hockey club, but he did not like the protective gear of ice hockey and enrolled instead in the figure skating club.

Takahashi had a successful junior career, winning the 2002 World Junior Championships in his first and only appearance at that competition. Takahashi is the first Japanese man to have won the title.

Senior career

Senior debut
For the 2002–03 season, Takahashi turned senior. He struggled with consistency during the first few years of his senior career. In 2004, he moved to Osaka to attend university – the university built a rink for him and other elite skaters.

Takahashi won a bronze medal at the 2005 Four Continents Championships and went on to the 2005 World Championships as the second-ranked of the two Japanese men on the World team, after Takeshi Honda. However, when Honda was forced to withdraw due to injury, it fell on Takahashi to qualify spots for Japan at the 2006 Winter Olympics. Takahashi placed 15th, qualifying only one spot for the Japanese men.

2005–06 season
In the 2005–06 season, Nobunari Oda emerged as a challenger for the Olympic spot. Oda and Takahashi both had very good Grand Prix seasons. At the 2005–06 Japanese Championships, Oda was declared the winner and, thus, seemed to have qualified for the one Olympic slot, but his gold medal was quickly taken back when an error was found in the way scores were calculated in the computer system at the event; Takahashi was awarded the gold. The Japanese Skating Federation split the international assignments, giving Takahashi the Olympic berth and Oda a place at the World Championship. At the 2006 Winter Olympics, Takahashi was in a good position after the short program but had a poor free skate and placed 8th overall.

2006–07 season
In the 2006–07 competitive season, Takahashi won a silver medal at 2006 Skate Canada International, then gold at the 2006 NHK Trophy. He qualified for the Grand Prix Final and won the silver medal, although he was ill. He won the Japanese Championships, taking the national title for the second year in a row, and then went on to the Winter Universiade in Turin, Italy, which he won as well.

Takahashi placed third in the short program at the 2007 World Championships. In free skating, he skated the performance of his life in his home country, placing first in that segment and ending up winning the silver medal, trailing Brian Joubert narrowly. This was the first silver medal for Japan in the men's event at Worlds.

Following that season, the ISU ranked Takahashi first in the world. However, over the summer, the ISU tweaked its scoring criteria. Takahashi had been placed on top, just ahead of Brian Joubert, partly due to Takahashi's victory at the Winter Universiade, a competition for which Brian Joubert was not eligible, as Joubert was not a university student. The ISU determined that the results of the Winter Universiade could not be used to calculate world ranking, and Takahashi's ranking fell from first to second place.

2007–08 season
In the 2007–08 season, he won gold at both his Grand Prix events and then silver at the Grand Prix Final behind Stéphane Lambiel. A few weeks later, he won his third Japanese national title and was named to the Four Continents and Worlds teams.

Takahashi won the 2008 Four Continents Championships, scoring a new record in free skating (175.84) and in the total score (264.41) under the ISU Judging System.

He was considered a favorite heading into the 2008 World Championships but finished off the podium after a disappointing free skating in which he fell on his second quad toe attempt, then stumbled on a triple Axel and triple loop, and, finally, performed an extra combination, an invalid element, which did not count towards his points total.

In May 2008, Takahashi announced that he had parted ways with Nikolai Morozov, who had been his co-coach for several years in Hackensack, New Jersey. Morozov explained the split by stating that he could no longer coach Takahashi due to problems with Takahashi's new agent. Takahashi continued training under coach Utako Nagamitsu and jump coach Takeshi Honda in Osaka, Japan.

2008–09 season
Takahashi was originally assigned to the 2008 Cup of China and the 2008 NHK Trophy for the 2008–09 Grand Prix season. He had to withdraw after suffering a torn ACL in his right knee on October 31, 2008, only a few days before his first event. It was later reported that Takahashi would undergo surgery to repair ligament damage and his right meniscus and would miss the entire 2008–09 season. A bolt was inserted into his right knee. He was able to return to the ice in April and began practicing jumps in June.

2009–10 season

After recovering from the surgery and returning to training normally, Takahashi began the Olympic season at the 2009 Finlandia Trophy, which he won. For the Grand Prix season, he was assigned to compete at the 2009 Skate Canada International and 2009 NHK Trophy for the 2009–10 season. He placed second at Skate Canada and fourth at the NHK Trophy. Those placements qualified him to compete in the Grand Prix Final. At the final, he led after the short program with a new personal best of 89.95 but was fifth in free skating and fifth overall.

He won his fourth national title at the 2009–10 Japanese Championships. At the 2010 Winter Olympics, Takahashi won the bronze medal with a score of 247.43. It is the first Olympic medal to be won by Japan in men's figure skating. He then won the gold medal at 2010 World Championships, becoming the first Asian to win a world championship in men's singles. At this competition, Takahashi attempted a quadruple flip but underrotated the jump and two-footed the landing.

2010–11 season
Takahashi's 2010–11 ISU Grand Prix events were the NHK Trophy and Skate America. At the 2010 NHK Trophy, he placed first with 234.79 points, 16.60 ahead of silver medalist Jeremy Abbott. Takahashi also won 2010 Skate America despite having a flawed short program and free skating. During a practice session at the Grand Prix Final, Takahiko Kozuka inadvertently collided with him while Takahashi was doing his run-through; Takahashi said, "it wasn't such a serious injury, just a bit of bruising. [...] It was the first time for me (to be involved in such an accident). I was surprised, but there was no malice involved." Takahashi placed third in short program. In free skating, he attempted a quad flip but landed it two-footed. Multiple problems, including low levels on two spins, resulted in a sixth-place finish in that segment, dropping him to fourth overall.

Takahashi won the bronze medal at the 2010–11 Japanese Championships. Takahashi won the 2011 Four Continents Championships. At the 2011 World Championships, he was third in the short program but finished in fifth overall. In free skating, a screw in his boot came loose on his first element, a quad toe. The Japanese team was able to get it fixed within the three minutes allowed, and he resumed his program. He said it may occur at any time regardless of inspections, which his coach does every day, and he does not blame her. On May 19, Takahashi underwent surgery to remove a bolt in his right knee stemming from surgery in late 2008. Following the surgery, he said, "It is thinner around my knee, but I feel better now that there is nothing inside my body. I might be imagining it, but it feels lighter."

2011–12 season

As part of his preparation for the 2011–12 season, Takahashi spent two weeks in August 2011 working with ice dancing specialists Muriel Boucher-Zazoui, Romain Haguenauer, and Olivier Schoenfelder in Lyon, France, to hone his skating skills. He said, "I wanted to improve my skating technique, not because I was bad in this sector, but I think Olivier is the best. I love the way he skates."

At 2011 Skate Canada International, Takahashi earned a score of 84.66 in the short program and 153.21 in free skating to win the bronze medal with a combined score of 237.87. At the 2011 NHK Trophy, he earned a new personal best score of 90.43 to take the lead in the short program, with a 10.66 point lead over teammate Takahiko Kozuka. He won the gold medal with a combined total of 259.75 points and qualified for the Grand Prix Final. He finished second at the Final. At the Japanese Championships, Takahashi was first after the short program with a score of 96.05 and placed third in free skating, scoring 158.38 points. With a total score of 254.60, he won his fifth national title, finishing ahead of Takahiko Kozuka and Yuzuru Hanyu, and was selected to compete at the 2012 World Championships, where he won the silver medal. The French crowd believed he deserved the gold medal over Patrick Chan, who had mistakes, including a fall on a double Axel, and booed the final result. Takahashi stated that he was pleased with the result, which he had not expected after his off-season surgery. Takahashi finished the season at the 2012 World Team Trophy. He set new personal best scores in the short program, free skating, and overall, and finished first in the men's event. His short program score, 94.00, set a new record as the highest ever under the ISU Judging System. It was Takahashi's first win over Patrick Chan since the 2010 World Championships.

On June 15, 2012, Takahashi confirmed that he would resume working with Morozov – Nagamitsu remained his primary coach, and Morozov became his advisory coach.

2012–13 season
Takahashi presented his new free skating for the season at the 2012 Japan Open. It was the first time since his injury that he performed two quad jumps in his free skating. He placed first in the men's event, and Japan took the team gold medal. He switched to new skating boots just after returning from training in the U.S. in October. This affected his practice schedule leading up to his Grand Prix events. Takahashi said: "The shoes happened to be uncomfortable beyond my expectations, which attributed to difficulty in blade adjustments. As a result, I was not able to practice as I had scheduled." At the 2012 Cup of China, his first Grand Prix event of the season, he won the silver medal behind Tatsuki Machida. Takahashi won the silver medal at his next Grand Prix event, the 2012 NHK Trophy, and qualified for his seventh Grand Prix Final. The 2012 Grand Prix Final took place in Sochi, Russia at the planned 2014 Winter Olympics rink. Takahashi placed first in the short program, third in free skating, and won his first GPF gold medal. He is also the first Japanese man ever to win a gold medal at the Grand Prix Final.

At the Japanese Championships, six strong competitors fought for three available spots on the Japanese men's world team. Takahashi came in second in the short program, nine points behind Yuzuru Hanyu. Takahashi was first in free skating but finished second overall. He was named to the Japanese team for the 2013 Four Continents Championships, held in Takahashi's current hometown, and the 2013 World Championships.

Takahashi announced he would change his short program to Moonlight Sonata. With roughly a month to prepare the new program, Takahashi said he was still trying to "feel" the music with his body. He was 4th in short program, 8th in free skating, and finished 7th overall at the Four Continents Championships. Takahashi was also 4th in the short program and 8th in free skating at the World Championships, finishing sixth.

2013–14 season
In the 2013–14 ISU Grand Prix season, Takahashi was 4th at the 2013 Skate America before winning the 2013 NHK Trophy.

At the Japanese Championships, he placed 4th in the short program and 5th in free skating to place 5th overall. He was named to the Sochi Olympic team.

At the Olympics, he finished 4th in short program and 6th in free skating to finish 6th overall, with a total score of 250.67. He was originally slated to compete at the 2014 World Championships in Saitama, Japan, but pulled out due to knee injury.

Takahashi announced his retirement from competitive skating in October 2014.

2018–19 season
Takahashi announced his intent to return to competitive skating at the start of the 2018–19 season. He placed second behind Shoma Uno at the Japanese championships but declined offers of international assignments.

2019–20 season
In September 2019, Takahashi announced that he would finish his competitive singles career that season and switch to competing in ice dance with partner Kana Muramoto.  He finished twelfth at the 2019–20 Japan Championships, his final appearance in singles competition.

2020–21 season
Following the conclusion of his singles career, Takahashi began training with Muramoto in Florida under Marina Zoueva, the coach of Olympic champions Virtue/Moir and Davis/White. Takahashi's star status in Japan made his decision to switch to ice dance a point of considerable interest in the country's media and figure skating audience.

Due to the COVID-19 pandemic, the Grand Prix was assigned based primarily on geographic location. Muramoto/Takahashi nevertheless traveled from Florida to Japan to make their debut at the 2020 NHK Trophy, in a field consisting of only three Japanese dance teams.  They were second in the rhythm dance, narrowly ahead of reigning national silver medalists Fukase/Cho but some six points behind the reigning national champions, Komatsubara/Koleto. In the free dance, Takahashi fell out of his second set of twizzles, which combined with missed levels of some lift elements to drop them to third place.  Winning the bronze medal, he called his mistakes unusual, even in practice sessions, but a part of actually competing. Muramoto said she felt they could do better at their next competition.

Making their Japan Championships debut, Muramoto/Takahashi placed second in the rhythm dance, less than four points behind Komatsubara/Koleto.  They were third in the free dance after Takahashi fell out of a lift and made several other errors, but won the silver medal overall due to Fukase/Cho also making errors. They were named as first alternates to the World team. In February, they were forced to withdraw as alternates due to a knee injury from Muramoto and were replaced by bronze medalists Fukase/Cho.

2021–22 season
Muramoto/Takahashi were again assigned to begin the season at the 2021 NHK Trophy, their lone assignment on the Grand Prix for the year. Sixth in both segments, they were sixth overall, defeating domestic rivals Komatsubara/Koleto by 7.30 points. Both expressed satisfaction with the results, but Takahashi said, "there is still a large gap we want to close to the top teams." They went on to win a silver medal at the 2021 CS Warsaw Cup.

The 2021–22 Japan Championships, the final national qualification event for the 2022 Winter Olympics, pitted Muramoto/Takahashi against Komatsubara/Koleto for the second time that season. Muramoto and Takahashi both fell in the rhythm dance, as a result placing second in that segment, five points back of their rivals. They won the free dance but took the silver medal overall for the second consecutive year and were subsequently named as alternates for the Japanese Olympic team. They were instead assigned to make their World Championship debut later in the season and were named to compete at the Four Continents Championships as well.

Muramoto/Takahashi won the silver medal at Four Continents, placing second in both segments, despite errors from Takahashi. He became the first person to win Four Continents medals in two different disciplines and said he could "hardly put my joy into words" but that he had been frustrated with his mistakes.

The team concluded the season at the 2022 World Championships, held in Montpellier with Russian dance teams absent due to the International Skating Union banning all Russian athletes due to their country's invasion of Ukraine. Qualifying to the free dance, Muramoto/Takahashi finished sixteenth.

2022–23 season 
At the end of May, Muramoto/Takahashi confirmed that they would continue through the 2022–2023 season.

After a sixth-place finish at the 2022 Skate America, they went on to compete at the 2022 CS Denis Ten Memorial Challenge, where they earned their first gold medal as a team. They then finished sixth at the 2022 NHK Trophy, their second Grand Prix.

At the 2022–23 Japan Championships, Muramoto/Takahashi became national champions for the first time and were subsequently named to compete at the 2023 World Championships and at the 2023 Four Continents Championships.

The team encountered difficulties at the Four Continents Championships, beginning in the rhythm dance, where Muramoto fell in the midst of their midline step element. Takahashi fell twice in the second half of their free dance. They finished ninth at the event, behind domestic rivals Komatsubara/Koleto.

Personal life 
Takahashi was a student at Kansai University, along with Nobunari Oda. He has three elder brothers.

After initially retiring from figure skating, Takahashi moved to Long Island, New York where he enrolled in English classes at a local university. During his stay he also studied several dance styles at the Broadway Dance Center.

He announced on January 15, 2023 that he changed the spelling of his name from 髙橋 大輔 to 高橋 大輔.

Public life and endorsements 
With the silver medal at the 2007 Worlds, Takahashi made many media appearances and performed in many ice shows in Japan. He was also invited to the French team's show Stars sur glace (Stars On Ice) in Paris, France. In 2008, he performed at Festa On Ice in South Korea.

In July 2007, the Japanese Olympic Committee selected Takahashi as one of the "JOC symbol athletes" (JOC paid about 20 million yen per year to the symbol athletes for the image rights. JOC partner companies can use images of JOC Symbol Athletes for free). The program provided him with funding from JOC partner companies.

After his win at 2010 Worlds, Takahashi appeared as a guest on many TV shows and as an advertising spokesperson for the "Use pesticides safely campaign" and Japan Post.

Programs

Ice Dance with Muramoto

Men's singles

Records and achievements 

 Takahashi is the first Asian male skater to win the World Junior Championships (2002 World Junior Figure Skating Championships in Hamar).
 He is the first Asian male skater to win a GPF medal (bronze at the 2005–06 Grand Prix of Figure Skating Final in Tokyo).
 He is the first Asian male skater to win a World silver medal (at the 2007 World Figure Skating Championships in Tokyo).
 He is the first Asian male skater to win an Olympic medal (bronze at the 2010 Olympic Games in Vancouver).
 He is the first Asian male skater to win the World Championships (2010 World Figure Skating Championships in Turin).
 He is the first Asian male skater to win the GPF (2012–13 Grand Prix of Figure Skating Final in Sochi).
 He is the first singles skater, male or female, to have represented Japan at three Olympic Winter Games.
 Takahashi is the most successful male skater at the NHK Trophy with five titles to his name (2006, 2007, 2010, 2011, 2013), in addition to earning one silver in 2012 and one bronze in 2005.
 Takahashi is the only skater to medal at the Four Continents Championships in two different disciplines (men's singles and ice dance). 
 He is the first skater to have attempted a 4F in an ISU sanctioned event (at the 2010 World Figure Skating Championships in Turin)

Historical world record scores
Note: Because of the introduction of the new +5 / -5 GOE (Grade of Execution) system, which replaced the previous +3 / -3 GOE system, ISU has decided that all statistics start from zero from the 2018–19 season onwards. All previous records are now historical.

Competitive highlights 
GP: Grand Prix; JGP: Junior Grand Prix

Ice dance with Muramoto

Men's singles

Detailed results
Small medals for short program and free skating awarded only at ISU Championships. At team events, medals are awarded for team results only.

Ice dance with Muramoto

Senior men's singles

References

External links 

 
 
 

! colspan="3" style="border-top: 5px solid #78FF78;" |World Records Holder

1986 births
Figure skaters at the 2006 Winter Olympics
Figure skaters at the 2010 Winter Olympics
Figure skaters at the 2014 Winter Olympics
Figure skaters at the 2007 Winter Universiade
Medalists at the 2005 Winter Universiade
Medalists at the 2007 Winter Universiade
Japanese male single skaters
Japanese male ice dancers
Living people
Olympic figure skaters of Japan
People from Kurashiki
Kansai University alumni
Olympic bronze medalists for Japan
Olympic medalists in figure skating
World Figure Skating Championships medalists
Four Continents Figure Skating Championships medalists
World Junior Figure Skating Championships medalists
Medalists at the 2010 Winter Olympics
Figure skaters at the 2003 Asian Winter Games
Season-end world number one figure skaters
Universiade medalists in figure skating
Universiade gold medalists for Japan
Competitors at the 2005 Winter Universiade